Hussaini Akwanga (3 March 1944 – 17 December 2021) was a Nigerian politician who served as Minister of Labour and Productivity during 2003.

Death 
He died on 17 December 2021, at the age of 77.

References

1944 births
2021 deaths
Nigerian politicians
Government ministers of Nigeria